Carl Peter Mazer (9 March 1807, Stockholm – 27 July 1884, Naples) was a Swedish painter, graphic artist, and photographer.

Biography 

His father, Jean-Pierre Mazer († 1829), was a silk weaver and stocking maker, originally from France. Johan Mazer, a noted merchant and musician, was his half-brother from his father's first marriage. At an early age, he became interested in painting, and was able to study with Gustaf Erik Hasselgren at the Royal Swedish Academy of Fine Arts. In 1825, he accompanied his father to Paris and took lessons from Antoine-Jean Gros; becoming his assistant and helping to paint the backgrounds on historical scenes. 

During the July Revolution of 1830, he manned the barricades. From 1833 to 1835, he was in Italy, then returned to Sweden. His first exhibition, of twenty-five paintings, took place at the Royal Academy in 1836.

In 1837, he spent some time in Finland, then went to Saint Petersburg. He would eventually spend fifteen years in Russia; living in Moscow and Yaroslavl, where he worked as a drawing teacher. He also travelled in barges down the Volga, from Nizhny Novgorod to Astrakhan, making sketches. In 1848, he visited Siberia, where he created a series of portraits of the revolutionaries who had been exiled there.

At the beginning of 1851, he opened a daguerreotype studio in Moscow, where he worked until the end of 1852; making copies of art works as well as taking portrait photographs. After returning to Stockholm in 1854, he had difficulty making a living from his art, and became exclusively involved with photography; creating a professional manual in 1864. He moved to Paris in 1876. After staying there for two years, he moved to Naples, where he died in 1884, aged seventy-six.

His unpublished memoirs and other manuscripts are in the collection of the Nationalmuseum, Stockholm.

Selected paintings

References

Further reading
 C.P. Mazer: Nationalmuseum hösten 1973, exhibition catalog, 
 Detailed biography @ the Svenskt biografiskt lexikon

External links

 Brief biography from the Nordisk familjebok @ Projekt Runeberg 
 Brief biography @ Photographer.ru
 Brief biography @ Art Investment

1807 births
1884 deaths
Swedish painters
Swedish portrait painters
Swedish photographers
Swedish people of French descent
Artists from Stockholm